Charles van Baar van Slangenburgh (31 March 1902 – 17 July 1978) was a Dutch footballer. He played in six matches for the Netherlands national football team from 1924 to 1925.

References

External links
 

1902 births
1978 deaths
Dutch footballers
Netherlands international footballers
Place of birth missing
Association footballers not categorized by position